Kate Brooks (born 1977) is an American photojournalist who has covered the Middle East, Afghanistan, and Pakistan since September 11, 2001.

Biography
At age 20, while studying Russian and photography, Kate became actively involved in the plight of Russian orphans, starting a non-profit aid group to help the children at an institution outside of Moscow, while documenting their lives. The resulting photographs  were published in Human Rights Watch's (HRW) report entitled "Abandoned by the State: Cruelty and Neglect in Russian Orphanages"  and syndicated worldwide through Saba Press Photos. The campaign for orphans' rights galvanized global interest and raised funds to help orphaned children. She has worked as a freelance photojournalist ever since.

Immediately after the September 11 attacks, Brooks was ordered to move to Pakistan to photograph the impact of U.S. foreign policy on the region and life in post-Taliban Afghanistan. In 2003, she covered the American invasion of Iraq and the beginning of the insurgency for Time Magazine.

Since then, Brooks has continued to work across the region, photographing news and the impact of conflict on civilian populations, notably the Cedar Revolution, Pakistan earthquake, 2006 Lebanon war, Iraqi refugee exodus, clashes in Nahr al-Bared, Afghan elections, aftermath of Operation Cast Lead in Gaza, Swat Valley refugee crisis and protests in Tahrir Square.

Brooks has photographed military and political leaders such as former Pakistani President Pervez Musharraf for Time magazine, President Asif Ali Zardari for The New York Times Magazine, Afghan President Hamid Karzai for GQ and Time, General Stanley McChrystal for The Atlantic cover story by Robert Kaplan, King Abdullah II and Lebanese Prime Minister Saad Hariri.

Her photographs have also appeared in The New Yorker, Smithsonian, Newsweek, U.S. News & World Report, Vanity Fair Italy, and The Wall Street Journal

Brooks was a Knight-Wallace Fellow in Journalism in 2012–2013.

Books
Her first book, In the Light of Darkness, was released in September 2011.

Documentary film
The Last Animals (2017) was about man-caused mass animal extinction

References

1977 births
Living people
American photojournalists
American women photographers
University of Michigan fellows
American expatriates in Pakistan
Women photojournalists